Write You a Song is the debut studio album by American country music artist Jon Pardi. It was released on January 14, 2014, through Capitol Nashville. The album includes the singles "Missin' You Crazy", "Up All Night", "What I Can't Put Down", and "When I've Been Drinkin'." It was certified gold in the United States by the Recording Industry Association of America (RIAA).

Promotion
On February 12, 2014, Pardi opened alongside Chase Rice and Chris Young for Dierks Bentley on his Riser Tour. On August 5, he announced the Up All Night Tour, a 20-city North American fall promotion that began on October 10 in Lincoln, Nebraska and December 20 in Columbus, Ohio.

Critical reception

Write You a Song received unanimously positive reception by music critics. At Country Weekly, Jon Freeman graded the album an A−, proclaiming that "We'll raise a glass to that." Steve Leggett of AllMusic rated the album three-and-a-half stars, stating that "The playing, production, and sound on Write You a Song are solid and professional, with enough edge to keep it from being simply predictable." At Digital Journal, Markos Papadatos rated the album four stars, saying that "Jon Pardi does a decent job on his debut studio album and hopefully, he will have more hits from it." Matt Bjorke of Roughstock rated the album four stars, writing that "The melodies are interesting, the songwriting is tight and Pardi is in strong voice throughout Write You A Song, which is all anyone can ask from a debut album and for anyone looking for someone to anoint as a potential ‘savior’ of Country music, Pardi may just be that guy for you." At Got Country Online, Tara Toro rated the album four stars, highlighting the album as "a cohesive package of country music that you’ll want to listen to again and again."

In 2017, Billboard contributor Chuck Dauphin placed three tracks from the album on his top 10 list of Pardi's best songs: "When I've Been Drinkin'" at number four, "What I Can't Put Down" at number six and "That Man" at number nine.

Track listing

Personnel
Adapted from the album's liner notes.

Musicians
Howie Adams — percussion
Brett Beavers — programming
J. T. Corenflos — electric guitar
Howard Duck — piano, Fender Rhodes, Wurlitzer electric piano, accordion, Hammond B-3 organ
Dan Dugmore — electric guitar, pedal steel guitar
Jenee Fleenor — fiddle
Lee Francis — bass guitar, U-bass
Keith Gattis — mandolin, electric guitar, acoustic guitar, gut string guitar
Tommy Harden — drums, percussion
Mike Johnson — pedal steel guitar
Andy Leftwich — fiddle, mandolin, ganjo
Rob McNelley — electric guitar
Jimmy Melton — banjo
Terry Lee Palmer — background vocals
Jon Pardi — lead vocals, acoustic guitar, electric guitar, ganjo
Brian Pruitt — drums, percussion
Joe Spivey — acoustic guitar, fiddle
Russell Terrell — background vocals
Robby Turner — pedal steel guitar

Technical
 Bart Butler — production
T.W. Cargile — recording
Ryan Gore — recording, mixing
Andrew Mendelson — mastering
 Jon Pardi — production
Jarod Snowden — digital editing

Chart performance
The album debuted at number 14 on the Billboard 200 chart, and number three on the Top Country Albums chart, with 17,000 copies sold in its debut week. As of February 2016, the album has sold 85,000 copies in the U.S.

Weekly charts

Year-end charts

Certifications

References

2014 debut albums
Jon Pardi albums
Capitol Records albums